Hippolyte De Kempeneer (1876–1944) was a Belgian film producer and director. He was one of the pioneers of the Belgian film industry during the silent era.

Selected filmography

Producer
 A Farmyard Drama (1921)
 The Judge (1921)
 Ramparts of Brabant (1921)
 Belgian Revenge (1922)

References

Further reading
 Ernest Mathijs. The Cinema of the Low Countries. Wallflower Press, 2004.

External links

1876 births
1944 deaths
Belgian film producers
Belgian film directors
People from Anderlecht